Avin-e Olya (also Romanized as Āvīn-e ‘Olyā; also known as Avin Bala and Āvīn-e Bālā) is a village in Fin Rural District, Fin District, Bandar Abbas County, Hormozgan Province, Iran. At the 2006 census, its population was 65, in 14 families.

References 

Populated places in Bandar Abbas County